The 2015 AIBA World Boxing Championships was held at the Ali Bin Hamad Al Attiya Arena in Doha, Qatar from 5 to 18 October 2015. This was a qualifying tournament for the 2016 Summer Olympics.

Opening ceremony
World pro boxing champions Mike Tyson, Manny Pacquiao and Amir Khan, were the celebrity guests for the event. The event was broadcast to nearly 500 million viewers in 112 countries. 260 boxers from 74 countries participated in ten weight classes, among the prizes were 23 tickets for the 2016 Summer Olympics in Rio de Janeiro.

Results

Medal table

Medal summary

Participating nations

  (7)
  (6)
  (3)
  (9)
  (8)
  (4)
  (1)
  (1)
  (2)
  (4)
  (4)
  (1)
  (1)
  (3)
  (2)
  (1)
  (2)
  (10)
  (1)
  (1)
  (2)
  (3)
  (4)
  (4)
  (3)
  (3)
  (4)
  (8)
  (1)
  (2)
  (6)
  (1)
  (1)
  (7)
  (5)
  (3)
  (2)
  (8)
  (1)
  (2)
  (1)
  (3)
  (5)
  (1)
  (4)
  (8)
  (4)
  (4)
  (1)
  (1)
  (3)
  (2)
  (3)
  (2)
  (6)
  (1)
  (7)
  (1)
  (2)
  (4)
  (2)
  (2)
  (6)
  (1)
  (1)
  (3)
  (3)
  (4)
  (9)
  (4)
  (9)
  (1)
  (8)

References

External links
 
 Official website
 Medal Count
 Official results of Medalists

 
AIBA World Boxing Championships
Boxing competitions in Qatar
AIBA World Boxing Championships
AIBA World Boxing Championships
Sports competitions in Doha
International sports competitions hosted by Qatar
AIBA World Boxing Championships
21st century in Doha